Ramendu Majumdar (born 9 August 1941) is a Bangladeshi actor, stage director and theater producer. In 2011, he was elected president of the International Theatre Institute (ITI) for the second time. He was the second Asian to be elected to this position since ITI's establishment in 1948 as an initiative of UNESCO. He was awarded Ekushey Padak by the Government of Bangladesh in 2009.

Early life and education

Majumdar was born on 9 August 1941 in Lakshmipur to Kuntal Krishna Majumdar and Leela Majumdar. He studied higher secondary at Comilla Victoria Government College. He studied English literature at the University of Dhaka.

Career
Majumder co-founded the Bangladesh Centre of the ITI. In 2008, ITI elected him as the president. He was elected again for the same position in 2011. He is the chairman of the Dhaka Arts Centre.

Majumder owns a theater group named Theater. As of 2014, the group has produced total 43 plays. He is chairman and managing director of Expressions Ltd, an advertising firm. He founded this firm in 1993 after working for a firm, Bitopi Leo Burnett, for 21 years.

Personal life
Majumdar is married to actress Ferdousi Mazumder. Their daughter, Tropa Majumdar, is also an actress.

References

External links
 

1941 births
Living people
Bengali Hindus
Bangladeshi Hindus
University of Dhaka alumni
Bangladeshi male stage actors
Recipients of the Ekushey Padak in arts
Bangladeshi dramatists and playwrights
Honorary Fellows of Bangla Academy
Comilla Victoria Government College alumni